Andrea Rodrigues (born 3 January 1973) is a Brazilian judoka. She competed at the 1992 Summer Olympics and the 1996 Summer Olympics.

References

1973 births
Living people
Brazilian female judoka
Olympic judoka of Brazil
Judoka at the 1992 Summer Olympics
Judoka at the 1996 Summer Olympics
Sportspeople from Santos, São Paulo
Pan American Games medalists in judo
Pan American Games bronze medalists for Brazil
Judoka at the 1995 Pan American Games
21st-century Brazilian women
20th-century Brazilian women